"Para Qué la Vida" ("What's the Point of Life") is the third single released internationally by Spanish singer-songwriter Enrique Iglesias from his fourth full-Spanish album Quizás (2002), It was released on 6 January 2003 (see 2003 in music)

Song information
The track was written by Cheín García-Alonso, Léster Méndez and Enrique Iglesias. It became his 16th number-one single in the Billboard Hot Latin Tracks and is notable for being the song that outranked Luis Miguel for most number one singles on Billboard's Hot Latin Tracks. Miguel would tie Iglesias in November 2003 with his 16th (and final) number-one hit, "Te Necesito". With the release of "Para Qué La Vida" Iglesias became the first Latin to be played over 1,000,000 times in the United States radio.

The song's lyrics borrows some translated lyrics from the song "Nothing Compares 2 U" written by Prince. The bridge of the song even contains the line "nada se compara a ti," which means "nothing compares to you."

Chart performance
The track debuted on the United States Billboard Hot Latin Tracks chart at number 39 on 29 March 2003, and rose to number 1 nine weeks later, spending one week at the summit. The single spent eighteen weeks in the chart.

See also
List of number-one Billboard Hot Latin Tracks of 2003

References

2003 singles
2002 songs
Enrique Iglesias songs
Spanish-language songs
Songs written by Lester Mendez
Songs written by Enrique Iglesias
2000s ballads
Pop ballads
Song recordings produced by Lester Mendez
Universal Music Latino singles
Songs written by Chein García-Alonso